Copernicus Airport Wrocław  is an international civil-military airport in Wrocław in Lower Silesian Voivodeship in southwestern Poland. It is Poland’s 5th busiest airport. It has one runway, one passenger terminal, one cargo terminal and one general aviation terminal. Wrocław airport is also often used by Polish Air Force, US Air Force, NATO air force and Heavy Airlift Wing.

History

Early years
The airport was built in 1938 as Flugplatz Breslau-Schöngarten Airport for German military purposes before World War II, when the city was still part of Germany. It was the site of a military aviation school, the Luftkriegsschule Breslau-Schöngarten, later renamed Luftkriegsschule 5. Among the Luftwaffe units stationed here just before the war were the Sturzkampfgeschwader 77, Kampfgeschwader 76, and Kampfgeschwader 1 "Hindenburg".

It was operated briefly by Soviet forces following the war before being used for civilian purposes in 1945. Services were operated to Warsaw, Łódź, Poznań and Katowice. By 1992 destinations also included Kraków, Rzeszów, Gdańsk, Szczecin and Koszalin.

'Port Lotniczy Wrocław S. A.' was established as a company in January 1992 and Wrocław airport assets operated by the state-owned Polish Airports authority were transferred to the company in January 1993.

The first international flights were inaugurated in January 1993, serving Frankfurt, Germany. Significant airport improvements have been completed in the late twentieth century. A new international departures terminal was opened in May 1997 followed by a new domestic terminal in November 1998.

Developments since the 2000s
A cargo terminal, international arrivals hall, and installation of a new meteorological system were completed in 1999; new fire station and apron extensions in 2000. A new air traffic control tower and duty-free area followed in 2001.

On 6 December 2005, the airport was renamed after the famous astronomer Nicolaus Copernicus (in Polish: Mikołaj Kopernik), who in Wrocław studied and received a scholarship, and in the years 1503 - 1538 was a scholaster of the Wrocław Collegiate Holy Cross and St. Bartholomew on the Cathedral Island. The airport's new name is Copernicus Airport Wrocław (Port Lotniczy Wrocław im. Mikołaja Kopernika). Terminal extensions were officially opened on the same day, increasing the airport's capacity to 750,000 passengers per year. On 19 July 2006, the architectural firm JSK was chosen to design a significant airport expansion. This includes plans for a new passenger terminal (eventually, after several stages of expansion, the airport will be able to handle 7 million passengers yearly) and assorted taxiway, apron and navigation equipment improvements (ILS). Also, car parking will be expanded to 1,000 spaces. The first stage, increasing the passenger capacity to 3.5 million yearly, officially opened on 29 February 2012. However, the new terminal opened to passengers on 11 March 2012.

In May 2014, the HEMS (Helicopter Emergency Medical Service) base was launched at the airport.

in 2015, Ryanair announced that it has selected Copernicus Airport Wrocław for its aircraft maintenance base. The construction of the hangar to fit 2 C-type aircraft (Boeing 737) was finished in June 2017. The airport has upgraded to ILS system from category I to category II in April 2016.

Until it was reformed (30 June 2010), the 3rd Air Base, whose barracks complex adjoins the airport also used the main runway of the airport. 

From 14 September 2020, the airport serves a regular cargo connection Wrocław - Cologne Bonn Airport carried out by ATR 72 plane by Swiftair for UPS. On November 16 - December 24, 2021, the second connection was carried out on this route, by Saab SF-340 plane by Airest. 

In October 2022, Ryanair began the expansion of WAMS (Wrocław Aircraft Maintenance Services) with another hangar with two spaces for C-type aircraft (Boeing 737).

Facilities
The airport operates modern domestic, international and cargo terminals. The international terminal contains a duty-free area in the international departures hall.

US Armed Forces Main Operating Base
Due to the existence of NATO garrisons nearby (Bolesławiec, Świętoszów, Żagań), in which US troops have been stationed as part of the Atlantic Resolve operation since January 2017, Wroclaw airport is very often used by US Air Force transport aircraft (inter alia Boeing C-17 Globemaster III, Lockheed C-130 Hercules, Lockheed C-5 Galaxy). On 23 September 2019, in New York, the presidents of the US and Poland signed a declaration on the deepening of defense cooperation, in which Wrocław Airport was designated as the headquarters of the US Army air transport base.

The District Infrastructure Board from Wrocław in July 2020 announced a tender for the preparation of pre-project documentation regarding the preparation of infrastructure for the aerial port of debarkation (APOD). On 25 September 2020, a contract was signed with the winner of the tender, which has until 30 June 2021 to complete the task.

Airlines and destinations

The following airlines serve regular scheduled and charter services to and from Wrocław:

Statistics

Following are the official airport annual traffic figures.

Ground transportation

Bus and coach
The airport is served by two MPK Wrocław bus lines, which on their routes have many stops in the city. Line 106 (day) or 206 (night) connect to main railway station and main bus station. Line 129 through the estates Strachowice, Żerniki, Kuźniki, Gądów Mały, Popowice, Różanka, Karłowice, Poświętne with the northern part of the Psie Pole district. Line 129 also connects the airport with the nearest railway station - Wrocław Żerniki (Żernicka stop).

From December 2017 Polbus-PKS started an express bus called WRO Airport Express connecting the airport with Dominikański Square (near the Market Square) and the main bus station, which is located in the basement of the Wroclavia shopping mall (suspended).

Flixbus on the route Szczecin-Zakopane also stops in the airport.

Car
The airport also is served by traditional taxi corporations, as well as Uber, Bolt, iTaxi. The airport offers nearly 4,000 parking spaces. There are car rentals at the airport.

Bike
There is also a bike path that leads to the airport.

Railway
There are future plans to build a railway line between the airport and Wrocław Główny railway station. A tunnel and a railway station have already been built under the main terminal.

See also
 SkyTaxi (airline)
 List of airports in Poland
 Koleje Dolnośląskie
 Transport in Poland
 Tourism in Poland

References

External links

 Official website

Copernicus Airport
Airports in Poland
Buildings and structures in Lower Silesian Voivodeship
Airports established in 1938
1938 establishments in Germany
Training establishments of the Luftwaffe